The Deputy Prime Minister of Fiji is the second-highest ranking minister in the Cabinet of Fiji.

Due to an incumbent coalition government, Fiji currently has three Deputy Prime Ministers, Bill Gavoka of the Social Democratic Liberal Party (SODELPA), Biman Prasad of the National Federation Party (NFP) and Manoa Kamikamica of the ruling People's Alliance.

References

 
Cabinet of Fiji